Saulx may refer to:
 Saulx (river), a river in France
 Saulx, Haute-Saône, France
 Saulx-le-Duc, Côte-d'Or, France
 Saulx-lès-Champlon, Meuse, France
 Saulx-les-Chartreux, Essonne, France
 Saulx-Marchais, Yvelines, France
 Gaspard de Saulx (1509–1575), French military leader

See also 
 Sault (disambiguation)